The discography of Winger, an American hard rock band, consists of six studio albums, one live album, two compilation albums and eight singles.

Albums

Studio albums

Live albums

Compilation albums

Singles

Videos

Video albums
 The Videos: Volume One (1989)
 In the Heart of the Young (1990)
 In the Heart of the Young Part 2 (1991)
 Live in Tokyo (1991)
 The Making of Pull (1993)
 The Making of Winger IV (2006)
 Winger Live (2007)

Music videos
 "Madalaine" (Winger)
 "Seventeen" (Winger)
 "Headed for a Heartbreak" (Winger)
 "Hungry" (Winger)
 "Can't Get Enuff" (In the Heart of the Young)
 "Miles Away" (In the Heart of the Young)
 "Silent Night" (In the Heart of the Young)
 "Easy Come, Easy Go" (In the Heart of the Young)
 "You Are the Saint, I Am the Sinner" (In the Heart of the Young)
 "Down Incognito" (Pull)
 "Spell I'm Under" (Pull)
 "In My Veins" (Pull)
 "Who's the One" (Pull)
 "Blue Suede Shoes (acoustic)" (IV)
 "Deal With The Devil"  (Karma)
 "Rat Race" (Better Days Comin)
 "Midnight Driver Of a Love Machine" (Better Days Comin''')
 "Tin Soldier" (Better Days Comin)
 "Better Days Comin'" (Better Days Comin')
 "Queen Babylon" (Better Days Comin')

Soundtracks and B-sides
 "Out for the Count" – Only released on The Karate Kid Part III Soundtrack. 1989
 "All I Ever Wanted" – Session track from In the Heart of the Young. Released as a B-side to the single "Miles Away"; track 3. 1990
 "Never" – Session track from In the Heart of the Young. Released as a B-side to the single "Headed For A Heartbreak (1991 Remix)"; Track 4. 1991
 "Battle Stations" – Only released on the Bill & Ted's Bogus Journey'' Soundtrack. 1991

References

External links
Official discography of Winger

Heavy metal group discographies
Discographies of American artists
Discography